Gerolamo Mascambruno (1597–1643) was a Roman Catholic prelate who served as Bishop of Isernia (1642–1643).

Biography
Gerolamo Mascambruno was born in 1597 in Benevento, Italy and ordained a priest on 29 Jun 1642.
On 11 Aug 1642, he was appointed during the papacy of Pope Urban VIII as Bishop of Isernia.
On 24 Aug 1642, he was consecrated bishop by Vincenzo Maculani, Archbishop of Benevento, with Alessandro Filonardi, Bishop of Aquino, and Maurizio Solaro di Moretta, Bishop of Mondovi, serving as co-consecrators. 
He served as Bishop of Isernia until his death in May 1643.

References

External links and additional sources
 (for Chronology of Bishops) 
 (for Chronology of Bishops)  

17th-century Italian Roman Catholic bishops
Bishops appointed by Pope Urban VIII
1597 births
1643 deaths